Sobhi, Sobhy, Subhy  or Subhi (transliterated as Ṣubḥī), is an Arabic name meaning "my dawn" or "my morning". It means "matutinal" if the yā (ي) at the end indicates a relative adjective or nisba of ṣubḥ (morning), thus it transliterated as Ṣubḥiyy.

Given name

Sobhi
Sobhi Abu Setta (died 2001), better known as Mohammed Atef, also known as Abu Hafs al-Masri, the military chief of al-Qaeda
Sobhi Mahmassani (1909–1986), Lebanese legal scholar, practising lawyer, judge, and political figure
Sobhi Saïed (born 1982), Tunisian handball player
Sobhi Sioud (born 1975), Tunisian handball player

Subhi
Subhi Abdilah Bakir (born 1980), Bruneian footballer 
Subhi al-Badri al-Samerai (1936–2013), Iraqi muhaddith 
Subhi Bey Barakat (1889–1939) was a Syrian politician
Subhi Saleh (born 1953), Egyptian lawyer, a prominent member of the Muslim Brotherhood
Subhi al-Tufayli (born 1948), leader of Hezbollah

Middle name
Ahmed Subhy Mansour (born 1949), Egyptian American Muslim cleric, activist, founder of the Quranist movement
Mohammed Sobhi al-Judeili (1983–2019), Palestinian paramedic who was killed by the Israeli Defense Forces (IDF)

Surname

Sobhi
Ahmed Sobhi (born 1991), Egyptian footballer
Gorgi Sobhi (1884–1964), Egyptian medical doctor
Mohamed Sobhi (actor), Egyptian actor
Nawaf Al-Sobhi (born 1990), Saudi Arabian football player 
Noureddine Sobhi (born 1962), Moroccan long-distance runner
Ramadan Sobhi  (born 1997), Egyptian footballer winger

Sobhy
Amanda Sobhy (born 1993), American squash player
Amr Sobhy, Egyptian information activist, social entrepreneur, author and poet
Mohamed Sobhy (footballer, born 1981), Egyptian footballer
Mohamed Sobhy (footballer, born 1999), Egyptian footballer 
Sabrina Sobhy (born 1996), American squash player
Sedki Sobhy (born 1955), Egyptian politician

Subhi
Mohsen Subhi (1963–2009), Palestinian composer of classical music
Mustafa Subhi or Mustafa Suphi (1883-1921), Turkish revolutionary communist militant leader

See also
Suphi

Arabic-language surnames